Margaret Weichert is an American businesswoman, inventor, and government executive, was Deputy Director for Management at the Office of Management and Budget from February 28, 2018 until March 25, 2020. Concurrently, she was Acting Director at the Office of Personnel Management from October 2018 until September 16, 2019. 

She has served as a principal at Ernst & Young since 2017. Weichert has also held executive leadership positions at Market Platform Dynamics, First Data, Bank of America, and Andersen Consulting focused on strategy, innovation, and business process improvement in banking and payments technology. In 1999, she co-founded an internet company, Achex, Inc., and sold that company to First Data in 2001. Achex was an online payment services developer specializing in secure checking account transfers over the internet. Weichert has been named as an inventor on 14 U.S. patents related to online financial services. She has served since 2010 on the Technology Association of Georgia Fintech Steering Committee.

References

Living people
Georgetown University alumni
Alumni of the University of Sussex
University of California, Berkeley alumni
21st-century American businesspeople
Trump administration personnel
Ernst & Young people
Bank of America people
Women government officials
Year of birth missing (living people)
Deputy Directors for Management of the Office of Management and Budget
Directors of the United States Office of Personnel Management